Cooke Peak is a somewhat elongated mountain surmounted by a central peak, standing  northwest of the Bode Nunataks in the Grove Mountains. It was mapped from air photos, 1956–60, by the Australian National Antarctic Research Expeditions, and named by the Antarctic Names Committee of Australia for D.J. Cooke, a cosmic ray physicist at Mawson Station, 1963.

References 

Mountains of Princess Elizabeth Land